Ash is a ballet made by New York City Ballet's ballet master in chief Peter Martins to Ash (1991) by Michael Torke. The premiere took place Thursday, June 20, 1991, at the New York State Theater, Lincoln Center. Ash was the fourth in a series of collaborations between the choreographer and composer.

Original cast
  
Wendy Whelan
Yvonne Borree
Rebecca Metzger
Monique Meunier
Kathleen Tracey

Nilas Martins
Albert Evans
Arch Higgins
Russell Kaiser
Ethan Stiefel

See also  
Black and White
Echo
Ecstatic Orange

Articles  
Sunday NY Times by Anna Kisselgoff, July 7, 1991

Reviews  
NY Times by Anna Kisselgoff, June 24, 1991
NY Times by Jack Anderson, June 15, 1999

Ballets by Peter Martins
Ballets by Michael Torke
1991 ballet premieres
New York City Ballet repertory